The men's 10 metre platform, also known as plain and variety diving combined competition, was one of four diving events on the Diving at the 1912 Summer Olympics programme. The competition was held from Friday 12 July 1912 to Monday 15 July 1912. Twenty-three divers from seven nations competed.

Results

The competition was actually held from both 10 metre and 5 metre platforms. Divers performed a standing plain dive and a running plain dive from the 10 metre platform, a running plain dive and a backward somersault from the 5 metre platform, and three dives of the competitor's choice from the 10 metre platform. Five judges scored each diver, giving two results. Each judge gave an ordinal placing for each diver in a group, with the five scores being summed to give a total ordinal points score. The judges also gave scores more closely resembling the modern scoring system.

First round

The two divers who scored the smallest number of points in each group of the first round plus the two best scoring non-qualified divers of all groups advanced to the final. Ordinal placings were used to rank divers within the group, but were not used to determine qualification.

Group 1

Group 2

Group 3

Final

In the final, ordinal placings were the primary ranking method with dive scores being used only to break ties.

References

Sources
 
 

Men
1912
Men's events at the 1912 Summer Olympics